Syed Darbar Ali Shah (21 July 1923 – 20 June 1996) was a Pakistani civil servant who served as a Central Superior Services officer. He held many important administrative positions, including that of Commissioner Karachi during the 1965 War between India and Pakistan. He was allocated in 1949 in District Management Group. He was one of the most senior officers of PAS. He was the batch-mate of another CSP office, Roedad Khan of Mardan, Khyber Pakhtunkhwa. During his career he served as Commissioner for Karachi, as part of the One Unit system under President Ayub Khan (Field Marshal), from 1961 to 1965. Shah died on 20 June 1996, at the age of 72.

Early life and career
Shah was born on 21 July 1923 to a small village, Mohallah Darbar Village Chakdara of Lower Dir, Khyber Pakhtunkhwa. After completing a local high school in Malakand, Shah went to Lahore to attend GC University.

Shah went on to become Commissioner of Karachi in 1961. He served as the chief administrator of Karachi during the Indo-Pakistani War of 1965.

Shah laid the foundation of Gulshan Town Karachi on the name of great poet Allama Iqbal.

Civil service of Pakistan
Syed Darbar Ali Shah joined the civil service of Pakistan in 1949 and has held several appointments, including those of Commissioner Khairpur, Commissioner Karachi, and Commissioner Peshawar.

References

 
 
 

1923 births
1996 deaths
Pakistani civil servants